Burwood is a north-eastern suburb of Christchurch, New Zealand. The suburb is mostly a residential area and is centred on Burwood Hospital, Travis Wetland Nature Heritage Park and Bottle Lake Forest (a  recreation, forested area).

Large areas of Burwood, including the Horseshoe Lake area, suffered severe damage in the 2010 and 2011 Christchurch earthquakes, and were abandoned under government policy that placed them in a residential red zone.

Demographics

Burwood had a population of 5,661 at the 2018 New Zealand census, an increase of 18 people (0.3%) since the 2013 census, and an increase of 6 people (0.1%) since the 2006 census. There were 2,109 households. There were 2,820 males and 2,844 females, giving a sex ratio of 0.99 males per female, with 1,107 people (19.6%) aged under 15 years, 1,146 (20.2%) aged 15 to 29, 2,523 (44.6%) aged 30 to 64, and 882 (15.6%) aged 65 or older.

Ethnicities were 87.7% European/Pākehā, 12.5% Māori, 3.4% Pacific peoples, 5.5% Asian, and 2.3% other ethnicities (totals add to more than 100% since people could identify with multiple ethnicities).

The proportion of people born overseas was 16.1%, compared with 27.1% nationally.

Although some people objected to giving their religion, 55.4% had no religion, 34.2% were Christian, 0.7% were Hindu, 0.5% were Muslim, 0.4% were Buddhist and 2.6% had other religions.

Of those at least 15 years old, 687 (15.1%) people had a bachelor or higher degree, and 978 (21.5%) people had no formal qualifications. The employment status of those at least 15 was that 2,367 (52.0%) people were employed full-time, 657 (14.4%) were part-time, and 174 (3.8%) were unemployed.

Education
Waitākiri Primary School is a contributing primary school catering for years 1 to 6. It had a roll of  students as of  Waitākiri was created in 2014 by the amalgamation of Burwood Primary School (opened 1872 as New Brighton Primary School) and Windsor School (opened 1970) in the Fifth National Government's Christchurch school restructuring.

References

Suburbs of Christchurch